The List of Aero L-39 Albatros operators lists the countries and their air force units that have operated the aircraft:

Military operators

Current

Abkhazia
Abkhazian Air Force
 4 L-39s as of December 2009

Algeria
Algerian Air Force
55 L-39s as of December 2020

Armenia
Armenian Air Force
 6 aircraft as of December 2020.

Angola
National Air Force of Angola
 4 aircraft as of December 2020.

Azerbaijan
Azerbaijan Air Force
 12 aircraft as of December 2020.

Bangladesh
Bangladesh Air Force
 Operating 7 L-39ZA out of 8 L-39ZA acquired in late 1990s. One was lost in a crash in 2012 killing a pilot.

Belarus
Belarus Air Force
 12 aircraft as of December 2020.

Bulgaria

Bulgarian Air Force
1/12 Training Squadron operating 6 L-39ZA aircraft.

Cuba
Cuban Air Force
operating 26 L-39C aircraft in three squadrons:
UM 3710 Escuadrón de Intercepcion
UM 1660 Escuela de Ensenanza de Vuelo Avanzada
UM 4768 Escuadrón de Intercepcion

Egypt
Egyptian Air Force
 1 aircraft as of December 2020.

Equatorial Guinea
Armed Forces of Equatorial Guinea
 2 aircraft as of December 2020.

Estonia

Estonian Air Force
 1 aircraft as of December 2020.

Ethiopia
Ethiopian Air Force
 10 aircraft as of December 2020.

Georgia
Georgian Air Force
 8 aircraft as of December 2020.

Kazakhstan
Kazakhstan Air Force
 17 aircraft as of December 2020.

Libya

Libyan Air Force
 181x L-39ZO acquired during Gadaffi's era.
 Ten former Libyan L-39ZO delivered to Egypt.
 10 aircraft as of December 2020.

Mali
Malian Air Force
 At least four L-39Cs delivered by Russia in August 2022.

Mozambique
Mozambique Air Force
 One L-39ZO acquired from Romania in 2013.

Nigeria

Nigerian Air Force
 8 aircraft as of December 2020.

Nicaragua 
Nicaraguan Air Forces

North Korea 
Korean People's Air Force
 60 L-39C

Russia
Russian Air Force
 181 aircraft as of December 2020.

Senegal
Senegalese Air Force
 4 L-39NG on order as of December 2020.

Slovakia

Slovak Air Force
 4x L-39C
 4x L-39ZA
 7 aircraft as of December 2020.

Syria
Syrian Air Force
 55 L-39ZO and 44 L-39ZA bought from Czechoslovakia in the 1970s and 1980s.
 61 aircraft as of December 2020.

Tajikistan
Tajik Air Force
 4 aircraft as of December 2020.

Tunisia
Tunisia Air Force
 9 aircraft as of December 2020.

Uganda
Ugandan Air Force
 8 L-39ZA as of December 2020.

Ukraine

Ukrainian Air Force
 47 aircraft as of December 2020.

Uzbekistan
Uzbekistan Air Force
 2 aircraft as of December 2020.

Vietnam
Vietnamese Air Force
 25 aircraft as of December 2020.

Yemen
Yemen Air Force
 28 aircraft as of December 2020.

Former

Afghanistan 

Afghan Air Force
The Afghan Air Force operated as many as 26 L-39Cs from 1977 through 2001, but only three of them survived in 2001. In December 2021, a report by Al Jazeera showed an Afghan L-39 undergoing an engine test at Kabul International Airport.

Cambodia 
Royal Cambodian Air Force
Formerly operated 6 L-39C trainer aircraft
Recently ordered 4 L-39NG trainer aircraft

Chad 
Military of Chad
 Operated 11 L-39ZO aircraft.

Republic of the Congo 
Congolese Air Force

Czech Republic 

Czech Air Force
 L-39C
 L-39ZA
 L-39V
 L-39MS

Czechoslovakia 
Czechoslovakian Air Force
 33x L-39C
 6x L-39MS
 8x L-39V
 30x L-39ZA

Two Czechoslovakian AF L-39Vs were delivered to the East German Air Force.

All Czechoslovakian Air Force aircraft passed to successor states – Czech Republic and Slovakia.

East Germany 
East German Air Force
 52x L-39ZO
 2x L-39V
 Two former Czechoslovak L-39Vs delivered to the East German Air Force.
 Twenty former East German L-39ZO delivered to Hungary.

Ghana 
Ghana Air Force
 2 L-39ZO

Hungary 

Hungarian Air Force
 20x L-39ZO
 Twenty former East German L-39ZO delivered to Hungary

Iraq 
Iraqi Air Force
 22x L-39C
 59x L-39ZO

Kyrgyzstan 
Kyrgyzstan Air Force
 4x (24 in store) L-39C

Lithuania 

Lithuanian Air Force
 1x L-39ZA

Romania 
Romanian Air Force
 32x L-39ZA

South Sudan 
South Sudan Air Force
 Unknown number of L-39 jets with logistical and maintenance support from Uganda

Soviet Union 
DOSAAF
Soviet Air Force
 2080x L-39C

All Soviet Air Force aircraft passed to successor states: Azerbaijan, Kazakhstan, Kyrgyzstan, Lithuania, Russia, Ukraine and Uzbekistan.

Thailand

Royal Thai Air Force
 37 L-30ZA/ART in commissioned from 1994 to 2021.

Turkmenistan 
Turkmenistan Air Force
 2 aircraft.

Civil operators

Australia
A small number of L-39s are flown in Australia as jet flight experiences for paying public.

Austria

Canada

Northern Lights Aerobatics Team

Northern Lights Aerobatics Team from Montreal used 2 L-39C in 2000, but ceased operating them and performing airshows after 2000. The aircraft were registered and based in the US with Northern Lights USA of Lafayette, LA with 1 lost in crash in 2001.

France
Breitling Jet Team
A civilian aerobatic display team based in Dijon, France; operating seven L-39 Albatros jets in the colours of their sponsor, Breitling.

New Zealand
Fighter Jets NZ operate 2 L-39 from Tauranga, NZ for jet flight experiences and also do airshow displays around the country.

Soviet Union
DOSAAF
DOSAAF paramilitary organization, tasked with the training and preparation of reserves for the Soviet armed forces, operated unknown number of L-39.

United States
Hundreds of L-39s are finding new homes with private owners all over the world, especially in the United States.

See also
Aero L-39 Albatros

References

Notes

Bibliography

Hoyle, Craig. "World Air Forces Directory". Flight International, Vol. 182, No. 5370, 11–17 December 2012. pp. 40–64. ISSN 0015-3710.
Aero L-39 Albatros page in Scramble magazine

Lists of military units and formations by aircraft
L-39 Albatros